Marklen Kennedy is an American actor, producer, film industry executive and founder of In Your Face Productions.

Biography
Kennedy was born in Houston, Texas and raised in Plano, Texas.  He graduated from Southern Methodist University in Dallas.  He played college football and was named to an All Southwest Conference Football Team and was a player of interest to both the Dallas Cowboys and the Oakland Raiders until a motorcycle accident ended his football career. He then moved to Los Angeles where he worked regularly as an actor until the nightlife industry. He moved to Las Vegas in 2002 and continued to expand his career in nightlife  as a Vice President for the Light Group and ran FOH for Bellagio's Light Nightclub, Mirage's Jet Nightclub and Tao Groups Tao Beach  before launching his career as a film and television producer.  He resides in Las Vegas with his wife, Actress and Model Carey Lessard, and their two children, Barbeque and Queso.

Professional life
Kennedy, was a producer for the History Channel's award-winning miniseries Texas Rising in 2015 and  appeared in one episode of the series as Texas Ranger, Zacharias Coffey. He is the owner and executive producer of In Your Face Productions and is the creator and executive producer of several series including Showtime's Gigolos in which he produced with Richard Grieco, FYI Networks Late Nite Chef Fight Lifetime's Postmortem in Vegas and FOX TV's Labor of Love. Kennedy has been a recurring character on Pawn Stars, and appeared in Melrose Place, and CSI: Crime Scene Investigation. He appeared on Lifetime’s series Vivica A. Fox’s Black Magic, which premiered in January 2017.

Kennedy, in addition to being a Producer, is an Ordained Universal Life Church Minister, who officiated the wedding ceremony of actor Cory Feldman and wife Courtney Anne in November 2016. Kennedy conducted the ceremony at Elton John's Fizz champagne lounge at Caesars Palace in Las Vegas.

Kennedy, who appears in and produced the movie Cops & Robbers released in 2016, produced the movie Female Fight Club appeared and produced the movie Fright Fest and produced the film Bruja in Mexico with MMA legend turned actor Randy Couture. In addition to his hit series Gigolos, Kennedy has produced Late Night Chef Fight and Trailer Park Housewives.

His next show “Labor of Love” aired on FOX in 2020. The story is based on his wife and him when they struggled to have their second child.

Billy F Gibbons from ZZ Top is his son's Godfather. Rock and Roll Hall of Famer, Billy Gibbons, made a surprise appearance inside a Texas elementary classroom to read for a stunned group of 2nd-graders.

Filmography

References

External links

Year of birth missing (living people)
21st-century American male actors
American male television actors
American male voice actors
American male film actors
Living people
Participants in American reality television series
People from Houston
20th-century American male actors